The Leaders is an Armenian romantic drama television series. The series premiered on Panarmenian TV on September 21, 2015. The TV series has also aired in Kazakhstan.
The series takes place in Yerevan, Armenia.

References

External links

 
 The Leaders on Armserial
 The Leaders on ArmFilm
 The Leaders on Hayojax.am
 

Armenian drama television series
Armenian-language television shows
Armenia TV original programming
2015 Armenian television series debuts
2010s Armenian television series